La otra cara del alma is a Mexican telenovela that premiered on Azteca Trece on 12 November 2012, and concluded on 10 May 2013. The telenovela is created by Laura Sosa, based on the 1985 Mexican telenovela written by Luis Reyes de la Maza, entitled El ángel caído. It stars Gaby Spanic as the titular character, and it premiered with a total of 6.9 million viewers.

Cast

Main 
 Gaby Spanic as Alma Hernández
 Eduardo Capetillo as Roberto Monteaguado
 Michelle Vieth as Daniela de la Vega
 Jorge Alberti as Armando de Alba
 Sergio Kleiner as Padre Ernesto
 Saby Kamalich as Josefina Quijano

Recurring 
 Cecilia Piñeiro as Sofía Durán
 Lambda García as Marcos Figueroa
 Melissa Barrera as Mariana Durán
 Adrián Rubio as Juán Robles
 Verónica Langer as Felícitas Durán
 Carmen Beato as Elvira de Alba
 Ramiro Huerta as Margarito Maldonado / El Gallo
 Sergio Bonilla as Abel Cifuentes
 Javier Escobar as Fernando Suarez / El Jejen
 Fernando Sarfatti as Joaquín de Alba
 Esmeralda Ugalde as Remedios Durán
 Giovanni Florido as Valiente
 Gala Montes as Young Alma Hernández
 Luis Cárdenas as Carlos de la Vega
 Marconi de Morais as Father Ernesto
 Ana Karina Guevara as Ernestina de Suárez

References

External links 

2012 telenovelas
2012 Mexican television series debuts
2013 Mexican television series endings
Mexican telenovelas
TV Azteca telenovelas
Spanish-language telenovelas